The 2016–17 season of the Eredivisie is played by 11 teams. They play a regular season, which is followed by championship play-offs. Os Lusitanos pulled out before the season started due to lack of representative players. Team Alkmaar took over all teams of Dansschool Biersteker, with that they secured their place in the Eredivisie. Since Os Lusitanos pulled out there is no team relegated to the Hoofdklasse.

Teams

References

Futsal competitions in the Netherlands